Martino La Farina (died 17 September 1668) was a Roman Catholic bishop who served as Prelate of Santa Lucia del Mela (1648–1668).

Biography
On 21 September 1648, Martino La Farina was appointed by Pope Innocent X as Bishop of the Territorial Prelature of Santa Lucia del Mela. He served as Prelate of Santa Lucia del Mela until his death on 17 September 1668.

References

External links and additional sources
 (for Chronology of Bishops) 
 (for Chronology of Bishops) 

1668 deaths
17th-century Roman Catholic bishops in Sicily
Bishops appointed by Pope Innocent X